Events in the year 2022 in Angola.

Incumbents 

 President: João Lourenço
 Vice President: Bornito de Sousa (until 14 September); Esperança da Costa onwards

Events 
Ongoing — COVID-19 pandemic in Angola

27 July - The Lulo Rose, a pink diamond, the largest in 300 years, is discovered at the Lulo mine in Lunda Norte Province, Angola.

24 August - 2022 Angolan general election: Angolans vote to elect their president in a tight race between incumbent leftist candidate João Lourenço and center-right candidate Adalberto Costa Júnior.

25 August - The electoral commission announces that President João Lourenço's MPLA has won the general election.

24 September - Thousands of people protest in Luanda, Angola, accusing incumbent president João Lourenço of electoral fraud in the latest election,

Deaths 

 18 May - Fernando Guimarães Kevanu, 85, Roman Catholic prelate.
 4 July - José Eduardo dos Santos, 79, politician.

References 

 
2020s in Angola
Years of the 21st century in Angola
Angola
Angola